Adam Croasdell is a Zimbabwean-born English actor. He played the role of Dr. Al Jenkins on the BBC soap opera EastEnders and has appeared on shows such as Blood of Zeus, Castlevania, Monarch, NCIS and Preacher. He has also voiced characters such as Torvin in Middle-earth: Shadow of Mordor, Ignis Scientia in Final Fantasy XV and Alfred Pennyworth and Nightwing in Batman Ninja.

Career
In 2009, Croasdell confirmed that he would be the body double for Daniel Craig in a 2010 released video game, in which he plays the role of James Bond.

Croasdell guest starred in the American show Supernatural, portraying the Norse god Baldur in the 19th episode of Season 5, "Hammer of the Gods". He also starred in Body of Proof series 2 episode 9 – "Gross Anatomy" as Ronan Gallagher which aired in the US on 29 November 2011 and in the UK on 1 March 2012.

He played Colonel Elmer Ellsworth, the first conspicuous casualty of the Civil War, in the 2012 film Saving Lincoln.

In 2015, he portrayed Brennan Jones, the father of Captain Hook, on the ABC fantasy drama Once Upon a Time.

In 2016, he voiced the character Ignis Scientia in the video game Final Fantasy XV.

Filmography

Film

Television

Video games

References

External links

British male film actors
British male stage actors
British male television actors
British male video game actors
British male voice actors
Living people
Zimbabwean male film actors
Zimbabwean male stage actors
Zimbabwean male television actors
Zimbabwean male video game actors
Zimbabwean male voice actors
Zimbabwean emigrants to the United Kingdom
20th-century British male actors
20th-century Zimbabwean male actors
21st-century British male actors
21st-century Zimbabwean male actors
Year of birth missing (living people)